Lasserre is a former commune in the Haute-Garonne department in southwestern France. On 1 January 2018, it was merged into the new commune of Lasserre-Pradère.

Population

See also
Communes of the Haute-Garonne department

References

Former communes of Haute-Garonne